Rudbari Konar (also Romanized as Rūdbārī Konār; also known as Rūdbār Konār) is a village in Goli Jan Rural District, in the Central District of Tonekabon County, Mazandaran Province, Iran. At the 2006 census, its population was 234, in 66 families.

References 

Populated places in Tonekabon County